The Sharp PC-1211 is a pocket computer marketed by Sharp Corporation in the 1980s. The computer was powered by two 4-bit CPUs laid out in power-saving CMOS circuitry. One acted as the main CPU, the other dealt with the input/output and display interface. Users could write computer programs in BASIC.

A badge-engineered version of the PC-1211 was marketed by Radio Shack as the first iteration of the TRS-80 Pocket Computer with just a marginally different look (outer plastic parts in black, not brown, gray display frame)

Technical specifications
24 digit dot matrix LCD
Full QWERTY-style keyboard
Integrated beeper
Connector for printer and tape drive
Programmable in BASIC
Uses four MR44  Mercury button cells
Battery life in excess of 200 hours
1424 program steps, 26 permanent variable locations (- or -) and 178 variables shared with program steps

Accessories
CE-121 Cassette Interface
CE-122 Printer

TRS-80 Pocket Computer ("PC-1")
A badge-engineered version of the Sharp PC-1211 was marketed by Radio Shack as the original TRS-80 Pocket Computer. (This was later referred to as the "PC-1" to differentiate it from subsequent entries (PC-2 onwards) in the TRS-80 Pocket Computer line.)

Introduced in July 1980, the "PC-1" measured 175 × 70 × 15 mm and weighed 170 g, and had a one-line, 24-character alphanumeric LCD.

The TRS-80 Pocket Computer was programmable in BASIC, with a capacity of 1424 "program steps". This memory was shared with variable storage of up to 178 locations, in addition to the 26 fixed locations named A through Z. The implementation was based on Palo Alto Tiny BASIC.

Programs and data could be stored on a Compact Cassette through an optional external cassette tape interface unit. A printer/cassette interface was available, which used an ink ribbon on plain paper.

See also
Sharp pocket computer character sets

References

External links

Sharp PC-1211 on MyCalcDB (database about 1970s and 1980s pocket calculators)
www.promsoft.com/calcs Sharp Pocket Computers
Daves Old Computers - TRS-80 Pocket Computer
The TRS-80 Pocket Computer

PC-1211
PC-1211
Computer-related introductions in 1980